Bia capivarensis is a species of flowering plant in the spurge family, Euphorbiaceae. It is native to the Serra da Capivara National Park in Brazil.

References

capivarensis
Flora of South America